Toups is a French surname found in Cajun communities. Notable people with the surname include: 

Alzina Toups (1927–2022), American chef
David Toups (born 1971), American bishop of the Diocese of Beaumont, Texas
Judith Toups (1930–2007), American birder and columnist
Mary Oneida Toups (1928–1981), American occultist
Wayne Toups (born 1958), American Cajun singer